= Princess Cinderella School =

Private children school in Mozambique

Coordinates: 25.96991°S 32.58576°E

Princess Cinderella School is a private English medium kindergarten, primary and high school in Maputo, Mozambique, teaching to the Cambridge Assessment International Education program.
